The 2020 Shady Rays 200 was a NASCAR Xfinity Series race held on July 9, 2020 at Kentucky Speedway in Sparta, Kentucky. Contested over 136 laps -- extended from 134 laps due to an overtime finish -- on the  speedway, it was the 14th race of the 2020 NASCAR Xfinity Series season. Team Penske's Austin Cindric won his first race of the season.

The Shady Rays 200 replaced New Hampshire Motor Speedway's date for the 2020 season due to the COVID-19 pandemic. It was the first of two races for the Xfinity Series at Kentucky.

Report

Background 

Kentucky Speedway is a 1.5-mile (2.4 km) tri-oval speedway in Sparta, Kentucky, which has hosted ARCA, NASCAR and Indy Racing League racing annually since it opened in 2000. The track is currently owned and operated by Speedway Motorsports, Inc. and Jerry Carroll, who, along with four other investors, owned Kentucky Speedway until 2008. The speedway has a grandstand capacity of 117,000. Construction of the speedway began in 1998 and was completed in mid-2000. The speedway has hosted the Gander RV & Outdoors Truck Series, Xfinity Series, IndyCar Series, Indy Lights, and most recently, the NASCAR Cup Series beginning in 2011.

The race was held without fans in attendance due to the ongoing COVID-19 pandemic.

Entry list 

 (R) denotes rookie driver.
 (i) denotes driver who is ineligible for series driver points.

Qualifying 
Noah Gragson was awarded the pole for the race as determined by a random draw.

Starting Lineup 

 The No. 74 and No. 99 had to start from the rear due to unapproved adjustments.
 The No. 78 had to start from the rear due to stopping in its pit box during the pit road speed check.

Race

Race results

Stage Results 
Stage One

Laps: 30

Stage Two

Laps: 30

Final Stage Results 
Laps: 74

Race statistics 

 Lead changes: 6 among 4 different drivers
 Cautions/Laps: 9 for 40
 Red flags: 0
 Time of race: 1 hour, 51 minutes, 31 seconds
 Average speed:

Media

Television 
The Shady Rays 200 was carried by FS1 in the United States. Adam Alexander, Stewart-Haas Racing driver Clint Bowyer, and Hendrick Motorsports crew chief Chad Knaus called the race from the Fox Sports Studio in Charlotte, with Jamie Little covering pit road.

Radio 
The Performance Racing Network (PRN) called the race for radio, which was simulcast on SiriusXM NASCAR Radio.

Standings after the race 

 Drivers' Championship standings

 Note: Only the first 12 positions are included for the driver standings.
 . – Driver has clinched a position in the NASCAR playoffs.

References 

2020 in sports in Kentucky
NASCAR races at Kentucky Speedway
Shady Rays 200
2020 NASCAR Xfinity Series